Cidade Tiradentes may refer to:
 Subprefecture of Cidade Tiradentes, São Paulo
 Cidade Tiradentes (district of São Paulo)